Djado is a ghost town in Bilma in Niger. The settlement lies on the plateau with the same name.  The settlement likely wasn't called Djado during its existence. The site is quite remote. No excavation has been done, so the real name of the settlement is unknown.

Geography 

The former Djado is located in an oasis,  in the northeastern part of Ténéré desert. Ténéré desert is considered part of the Sahara. It is located on the southeastern end of the Djado plateau. For the administration, there's also a modern-day commune called Djado. The modern-day commune also comprises the Menfueni plateau and the Thchigai plateau. Modern-day Djado is the northernmost and easternmost commune in Niger. To the north, it borders Algeria and Libya, to the east, it lies on the border to Tchad. Neighboing communes in Niger are  Dirkou to the south,  Fachi to the southeast, and  Iférouane to the west.

There are three villages in the commune:  Chirfa, Séguédine and Yaba. In addition, there are the nomad camps of Djado and Tchounouk, as well as military camps. The main settlement is the village Chirfa.

The ruins of Djado are on top of rocky cliffs. At the bottom of these cliffs are subterranean ponds, which also serve as an ideal breedng ground for mosquitoes. Dpeending on the season, some of these ponds almost dry up completely. From the cliffs, the Kaouar valley can be reached. There's a desert made of pebbles to the west, beyond lie the Aïr mountains.

History 

According to the tradition of the local  Kanuri , the  Sao founded Djado. They also founded other places, such as Tedjerhe in southern Fezzan. Tedjerje is the oldest known settlement  of the Kaouar. It was the most important city culture of the Kotoko south of Lake Tchad. The ruins look like those of a city. Their modern-day name links them to Djado in Nafusa Mountains, southwest of Tripolis. 

These two characteristics seem to point to a people that was sessile, but the current population of the region is mostly nomadic. The people who inhabited Djado had these points in common with Berber people. 

Djado was part of the kingdom of Sayfema of Kanem-Bornu at least since the reign of Dunama Dibalemi (1203–1243). Fr part of the time, they were independent, but they re-joined the empire of Idris Alauma (1564–1596).

As the power of the Bomu empire decreased, the people of the oasis were exposed to several raids of the Touareg, in the 18th and 19th century. They started to leave the place, and settled in Kaouar. Another reason might be that cattle herding in the region also introduced mosquitoes that spread malaria. In 1860, about 1000 Kanuri are said to have been left. In the middle of the 20th century, only a few Kanuri and Toubou were left. They mostly lived from growing dates, and harvesting salt. 

The military outpost Madama was created in 1930, when Niger was a French colony. In 1988. Rallye Sakar passed through Djado.

In 2014, gold was discovered, which attracted up to 20.000 people from Niger, Chad, Libya and Sudan. Because there were many heavily-armed foreigners, and working conditions were very bad, Moussa Hassane Barazé, the responsible minister for mining operations, ordered the mines to be closed in 2017.

Population 
In 2012, 876 people lived in the commune, in 168 households. In 2001, the count had been 936 people in 202 households.In the main village, there were 2088 people in 63 households, at the 2012 count; In 2001, 208 people in 45 households, and in 1998, 260 people in 74 households.

When it comes to harvesting, there are Tubu the area near the ghost town. In the eastern part of the commune, the language Tedaga , as well as Lybian Arabic are spoken. On the Algerian border, Tahaggart, a Tuareg language, is common.

Books

References

Populated places in Africa
Ghost towns in Africa
Archaeological sites in Africa
Archaeological sites in Niger
Agadez Region